The Men's 1 km Time Trial C1-2-3 track cycling event at the 2016 Summer Paralympics took place on September 11. Twenty six riders competed.

Results

References

Men's 1 km time trial C1-3